Many microcomputer makes and models could run some version or derivation of the CP/M disk operating system. Eight-bit computers running CP/M 80 were built around an Intel 8080/8085, Zilog Z80, or compatible CPU. CP/M 86 ran on the Intel 8086 and 8088. Some computers were suitable for CP/M as delivered. Others needed hardware modifications such as a memory expansion or modification, new boot ROMs, or the addition of a floppy disk drive. A few very popular home computers using processors not supported by CP/M had plug-in Z80 or compatible processors, allowing them to use CP/M and retaining the base machine's keyboard, peripherals, and sometimes video display and memory.

The following is an alphabetical list of some computers running CP/M.

A
 Ai Electronics ABC-24 / ABC-26 (Japan, running Dosket, CP/M & M/PM)
 Action Computer Enterprise ACE-1000
 Action Computer Enterprise Discovery D-500 (CP/M-80 on each of up to 4 user processors, DPC/OS on service processor)
 Action Computer Enterprise Discovery D-1600 (CP/M-80 on each of up to 15 user processors, DPC/OS on service processor)
 Actrix Computer Corp. Actrix (Access Matrix)
 Advanced Digital Corporation Super Six
 Allen Bradley Advisor - Industrial Programmable controller graphical user interface (development mode only), fl. ca. 1985
 Alspa 
 MITS Altair 8800
 Altos 580
 Amada Aries 222/245 CNC turret punch press
 Amstrad CPC 464 (w/DDI-1 disk drive interface), 664, 6128, 6128Plus
 Amstrad PCW 8256/8512/9512/9256/10
 Amust Executive 816
 Apple II (with a Z-80 card like the Microsoft SoftCard; on some clones a SoftCard equivalent was built into the mainboard)
 Apple III (with a Z-80 card like the Apple SoftCard III)
 Applied Technology MicroBee (56KB+ RAM models)
 Aster CT-80
 Atari 800 and XL/XE (with ATR8000 module, LDW Super 2000, CA-2001 or Indus GT disk drives expanded to 64k)
 Atari ST - runs GEMDOS, which was DRI's more advanced replacement for CP/M for use with their GEM GUI
 ATM-turbo - Soviet/Russian clone of ZX-Spectrum with extension graphic and 512/1024Kb RAM: CP/M 2.2 in ROM
 AT&T 6300 with CPU 3 upgrade
 AT&T 6300 PLUS

B
 Basis 108
 BBC Micro (with external Z80 module)
 Beehive Topper II
 BMC if-800
 Bondwell II,12, 14
 BT Merlin M2215 series based on ICL PC-2 (CP/M) (also ran MP/M II+)
 BT Merlin M4000 series based on Logica Kennett (Concurrent CP/M-86)

C
 Camputers Lynx (96k/128k models)
 Casio FP1000 FL
 CASU Super-C - Z80 based with a 21 slot S100 bus (Networkable with MP/M) - UK manufactured
 CASU Mini-C - Z80 based with a 7 slot S100 bus and twin 8" floppy disk drives (Networkable with MP/M) - UK manufactured
 Challenger III - Ohio Scientific OSI-CP/M
Cifer Systems 2684, 2887, 1887 - Melksham, England.
 CIP04 - Romanian computer
 CoBra - Romanian computer
 Coleco Adam (with a CP/M digital data pack)
 Comart Communicator (CP/M-80), C-Frame, K-Frame, Workstation and Quad (Concurrent CP/M-86)
 Commodore 64 (with Z80 plug-in cartridge)
 Commodore 128 (using its internal Z80 processor—along with its 8502—ran CP/M+ which supported memory paging)
 Compaq Portable - was available with CP/M as a factory installed option.
 Compis
 Compupro
 Cromemco
 C't180 HD64180 ECB-System (CP/M2.2 & 3.x)
 Cub-Z - Romanian made computer

D
 Datamax UV-1R
 Data Soft PCS 80 and VDP 80 (France, 1977)
 Data Technology Industries "Associate" (USA, 1982)
 DEC Rainbow 100/100+ (could run both CP/M and CP/M-86)
 DEC VT180 (aka Personal Computing Option, aka 'Robin')
 Digital Group DG1

E
 Eagle Computer Eagle I, II, III, IV, V
 ELWRO 800 Junior Polish clone of Sinclair ZX spectrum—running CP/J, a CP/M derivative with simple networking abilities
 ENER 1000
 Enterprise 128 (with EXDOS/IS-DOS extensions)
 Epic Episode
 Epson PX-4, PX-8 (Geneva), QX-10, QX-16
 Eracom ERA-50 & ERA-60 with encrypted disks (Eracom Corporation, Australia)
 Exidy Sorcerer

F

 Ferguson Big Board
 FK-1 - Czech microcomputer
 Franklin ACE 1000 (with Microsoft Z-80 SoftCard)
 Franklin ACE 1200 (includes a rebranded PCPI Appli-Card)
 Fujitsu Micro 7 (with Z-80 plug-in card)

G
 General Processor GPS5 (Italy, running CP/M 86 - Concurrent CP/M 86)
 General Processor Model T (Italy, 1980 running CP/M 80)
 Grundy NewBrain
 Genie II, IIs, III, IIIs
 Goupil G3
 G.Z.E. UNIMOR Bosman 8  (Poland, 1987 running CPM/R, CP/M 2.2 compatible)
 Gemini 801 and Gemini Galaxy (UK, 1981-1983 running CP/M 2.2 and MP/M)

H
 HBN Computer (Le) Guépard
 HC-88
 HC-2000
 Heath/Zenith Heathkit H90|H90 and Heathkit H89/Zenith Z-89
 Hewlett-Packard HP-85 / HP-87 (with addition of CP/M Module containing Z80)
 Hewlett-Packard HP-125 and HP-120, one Z80 each for CP/M and the inherent HP terminal
 Hobbit
 Holborn 6100
 Holborn 9100 (Netherlands, 1981)
 Husky Computers Ltd Hunter (1 and 2, 16), Hawk

I
 Ibex 7150 and other models
 ICL PC-1 (CP/M) (also ran MP/M)
 ICL PC-2 (CP/M) (also ran MP/M II+)
 ICL PC-16 (Concurrent CP/M-86)
 ICL PC Quattro (Concurrent CP/M-86)
 ICL DRS8801 (CP/M-86)
 ICL DRS300 (Concurrent CP/M-86)
 ICL DRS20 (CP/M or Concurrent CP/M-86)
 IBM Displaywriter
 IBM PC (CP/M-86 only; CP/M-80 with the Baby Blue Z-80 card)
 IMSAI 8080
 IMSAI VDP-80 (8085 3 MHz)
 Intel MDS-80
 Intertec Superbrain
 Iotec
 Iskra Delta Partner
 Itautec I-7000, I-7000G, I-7000 Jr. (SIM/M)
 ITT 3030
 Ivel Ultra

J
 JET-80 (Swedish Made Computer)
 Juku E5101–E5104 came with an adaptation of CP/M called EKDOS
 JUNIOR Romanian Computer

K
 Kaypro
 KC 85/2-4
 Kontron PSI98 (KOS & CP/M2.2)
 Korvet (Корвет) — Soviet PC

L
 Labtam
 LNW-80
 LOBO Max-80
 Logica VTS 2200 (CP/M-86)
 Logica VTS Kennet (Concurrent CP/M-86)
 LOS 25 (10 MB harddisc)
 Luxor ABC 802, ABC 806 (Sweden, 1981)

M
 MCP (128K, Z80, S-100 bus)
 MC CP/M Computer (Z80 ECB-System, CP/M2.2)
 Megatel Quark
 Memotech MTX
 MicroBee
 Micro Craft Dimension 68000 (CP/M-68K, and CP/M-80 with optional Z80 card)
 Micromation M/System, Mariner and MiSystem (MP/M and MP/M II)
 Micromint SB180 (Hitachi HD64180 CPU)
 Mikromeri Spectra Z (Finland)
 Morrow Designs (MD2, MD3, MD11)
 MSX (some MSX-standard machines ran the CP/M-like MSX-DOS)
 Mycron 3
 M 18 Romanian Computer
M 118 Romanian Computer
 MK 45 Polish computer based on MCY7880

N
 N8VEM
 N8VEM ZetaSBC
 Nabu Network PC
 Nascom 1, 2
 NCR Decision Mate V
 NEC APC
 NEC PC-8001 Mk II
 NEC PC-8801
 Nelma Persona
 NorthStar Advantage (all in one computer)
 NorthStar Horizon (S-100)
 Nokia MikroMikko 1
 NYLAC Computers NYLAC (S-100)

O
 Ohio Scientific computers using the 510 triple-processor CPU board
 OKI IF-800 (Z80 5 MHz) Second Z80 on video controller
 Olivetti ETV300
 Olivetti M20 (CP/M-8000)
 Osborne 1
 Osborne Executive
 Osborne Vixen
 Otrona Attaché
 Otrona Attaché 8:16

P
 P112
 Philips P2000T
 Philips 3003/3004
 Piccolo RC-700|Piccolo
 Piccoline RC-759
 Pied Piper
 PolyMorphic Systems 8813
 The Portable Computer Co (AU) PortaPak 
 Profi - Soviet/Russian clone of ZX-Spectrum with extension grafic and 1024Kb RAM: CP/M plus in ROM
 Processor Technology Sol-20 (optional)
 Pulsars Little Big Board

Q
 Quasar Data Products QDP-300

R
 RAIR "Black Box" (also ran MP/M)
 Regnecentralen Piccolo RC-700
 Regnecentralen Piccoline RC-759
 Research Machines 380Z and LINK 480Z
 Retro! Z80 by John Winans
 Rex Computer Company REX 1
 Robotron A 5120
 Robotron KC 85, KC 87
 Robotron PC 1715
 Royal Business Machines 7000 "Friday"

S
 SAGE II / IV CP/M-68K
 SAM Coupé - (Pro-Dos = CP/M 2.2)
 Samsung SPC-1000
 Sanyo MBC families (i.e. MBC-1150)
 SBS 8000
 Scandis
 Seequa Chameleon
 Sharp MZ series 
 Sharp X1 series
 Sirius 1 (sold in the U.S. as the Victor 9000)
 Software Publisher's ATR8000
 Sony SMC-70
 Sord M5 has CP/M as an option, CP/M-68K standard for the M68/M68MX
 Spectravideo SV-318/328
 Sperry Univac UTS 40 CP/M 2.2 - Zilog 80
 Stride 400 series CP/M-68K was one of many operating systems on these
 ZX Spectrum family (built by Amstrad)

T
 Tatung Einstein TC-01 (runs Xtal/DOS which is CP/M compatible)
 Tandy TRS-80
 Technical Design Labs (TDL) XITAN
 TeleData (Z80 Laptop)
 Telenova Compis (CP/M-86)
 Teleputer III
 Televideo TS-80x Series
 Televideo TS-160x Series
 TI-99/4A (with the MorningStar CP/M card or the Foundation CP/M card)
 Tiki-100 (runs KP/M, or later renamed TIKO. A CP/M 2.2 Clone.)
 TIM-011
 TIM-S Plus
 Timex FDD3000 (on Z80 CPU) with ZX Spectrum as terminal.
 Toshiba T100
 Toshiba T200
 Toshiba T200 C-5 
 Toshiba T200 C-20 
 Toshiba T250
 Transtec BC2
 Triumph-Adler AlphaTronic P1/P2
 Triumph-Adler AlphaTronic P3/P4
 Triumph-Adler AlphaTronic P30/P40
 Triumph-Adler AlphaTronic PC (CPU was a Hitachi Z80 clone)
 Tycom Microframe

U
 Unitron 8000, a dual processor machine built São Paulo in the early 1980s.  The Unitron could boot either as an Apple II clone (using a clone 6502 processor) or in CP/M (using the Z80).

V
 Vector-06C (Intel 8080, 16 color graphics, made in USSR)
 Vector Graphic Vector Graphic Corporation Vector Model 1,2 (Internal Model),3, Model 4 (Z80 & 8088 CP/M, CP/M-86 & PCDOS), Model 10 (Multiuser)
 Victor 9000 (sold as the Sirius 1 in Europe)
 Video Technology Laser 500/700
 Visual Technology (Lowell, Ma) Visual 1050, 1100 (Not Released)

W
 Wave Mate Bullet
 Welect 80.2 (France, 1982)
 West PC-800

X
 Xerox 820
 Xerox Sunrise 1800 / 1805

Y
 Yodobashi Formula-1

Z
 Zenith Data Systems Z-89 (aka Heathkit H89)
 Zenith Data Systems Z-100 (CP/M-85)
 Zorba

References

External links
Intel iPDS-100 Using CP/M-Video

CP M